Ellen Alice Anderson (22 June 1882 – 4 February 1978) was a New Zealand district nurse. She was born in Eketahuna, Wairarapa, New Zealand on 22 June 1882.

References

1882 births
1978 deaths
New Zealand nurses
People from Eketāhuna
New Zealand women nurses